Watery, Domestic is the fourth EP by American indie rock band Pavement. It is their final release to feature drummer Gary Young as a member.

Background 
The record marked the recording debuts of both Bob Nastanovich and Mark Ibold on percussion and bass respectively - although both had been touring members for some time, the debut album, Slanted and Enchanted and the preceding EPs had been recorded by a trio of Stephen Malkmus, Spiral Stairs and Gary Young.

Recording 
All four songs can also be found on Slanted and Enchanted: Luxe & Reduxe, the liner notes to which identify a further 3 songs as having been recorded during the same session. As well as the standard CD and 12" vinyl releases, the record was also available as a 12" picture disc in the UK.

Packaging 
The image of the rooster on the cover was created by defacing the cover of the self-titled album by Ambergris, with the photographic rooster image by Stephen S Myers, American, born 1942. The art direction for the original rooster image was provided by Thom Williams.

Bob Nastanovich revealed on the Discograffiti podcast that the EP's title was a reference to Nastonvich's beer preferences, since his tastes typically went towards low-alcohol American beer brands.

Legacy 
"Texas Never Whispers" was sampled by Placebo for their song "Slave to the Wage" from their 2000 album Black Market Music. It was also recorded by Deadsy for their debut demo in 1995.

"Frontwards" has been covered by both Cardiff-based indie-pop band Los Campesinos! and Hamilton Leithauser.

"Shoot the Singer (1 Sick Verse)" is often covered live by Yoni Wolf of the band Why?.

Track listing

Personnel

Pavement 
 Stephen Malkmus – guitar, lead vocals
 Scott Kannberg – guitar, backing vocals
 Gary Young – drums
 Bob Nastanovich – percussion, backing vocals
 Mark Ibold – bass guitar

Technical 

 Thom Williams – art direction
 Stephen Myers – photography

References

Pavement (band) albums
1992 EPs